Unjoo Moon (문은주,born 1964) is an Australian film director, best known for the 2020 biopic I Am Woman, that tells the story of international feminist icon Helen Reddy.

Early life and education
She was born in Daegu,South Korea in 1964,and her father Moon dong seok was the former leader for an association of Korean Australians in Sydney. After she arrived in Australia at the age of 4, she was raised in Sydney. Moon studied Arts/Law at the University of New South Wales before working at the Australian Broadcasting Corporation as a TV and print journalist. She left journalism to study film at the Australian Film and Television and Radio School, winning the Kenneth B. Myer award and meeting her partner, Oscar-winning cinematographer Dion Beebe. Together they moved to Los Angeles, where Moon attended the American Film Institute, graduating with a Master of Fine Arts and receiving the Franklin J Schaffner Directing Award.

Career 
Moon directed The Zen of Bennett, a 2012 documentary on jazz singer Tony Bennett, produced by Bennett's son Danny and Jennifer Lebeau. The New York Times described it as "a tender, touching documentary portrait”.

After the 2017 Las Vegas shooting, she worked with spoken word artist In-Q on a public service video about gun violence. 

In October 2021, Moon was tapped to direct Frankly in Love, an adaptation of David Yoon's debut novel of the same name.

I Am Woman (2020) 

I Am Woman, the film, is named after Australian singer Helen Reddy's most famous song, "I Am Woman", which became a feminist anthem during the rise of the women's movement in the 1970s. It follows Reddy from her arrival in New York in 1966, through her friendship with rock writer Lillian Roxon and her troubled marriage to manager Jeff Wald. Moon met Reddy at a "G'Day Australia" event in Los Angeles in 2013, and was surprised to find that her personal story, so entwined with the women's rights movement in the US, had never been told. 

Moon told a journalist: "Growing up I remember a time when my mother and her friends – these bright, intelligent, and vibrant women – would roll down the windows of their Volvo station wagons, let down their hair, and sing really loudly when Helen Reddy’s song, I Am Woman, was on the radio. I have this very strong memory of watching how that song transformed women, and the lyrics stayed with me as they do with most people". She showed the finished film to Reddy before it was locked off, and Reddy sang along to her songs while watching, and cried.

Moon said that the movie has particular relevance now, in the #metoo era as women's rights have returned to the fore.

Selected filmography 
2017 The Wrong Side of History: Gun Violence
2012 The Zen of Bennett
2011 Tony Bennett & Amy Winehouse: Body and Soul
1998 Sorrow's Child
1993 Deadlock
1991 Two Fish; Black Sorrow; Flitters; Azzadine

Awards 
2020 Athena Breakthrough Award
Kenneth B. Myer award 
1999 Best Short Film; Shorts International Film festival

References 

1964 births
Living people
Australian film directors
University of New South Wales alumni
Australian Film Television and Radio School alumni
Australian people of Korean descent